Theodore Edward Harris (11 January 1919 – 3 November 2005) was an American mathematician known for his research on stochastic processes, including such areas as general state-space Markov chains (often now called Harris chains), the theory of branching processes and stochastic models of interacting particle systems such as the
contact process. The Harris inequality in statistical physics and percolation theory is named after him.

He received his Ph.D. at Princeton University in 1947 under advisor Samuel Wilks.  From 1947 until 1966 he worked for the RAND Corporation, heading their mathematics department from 1959 to 1965. From 1966 until retirement in 1989 he was Professor of Mathematics and Electrical Engineering at University of Southern California.

He was elected to the United States National Academy of Sciences in 1988.

Selected publications

Books
 Harris, Theodore E. "The theory of branching processes". Springer-Verlag, Berlin. (1963) 230 pp.

Papers

References

20th-century American mathematicians
21st-century American mathematicians
Members of the United States National Academy of Sciences
Probability theorists
Presidents of the Institute of Mathematical Statistics
1919 births
2005 deaths